Charles Frederic d'Arensbourg (sometimes written D'arensbourg or Darensbourg) (1693–1777), born Karl Friedrich von Arensburg, was an early leader in the settlement of the German Coast region of Louisiana.

Early life 
Karl Friedrich von Arensburg was born in 1693 in Stettin, Swedish Pomerania, to ethnically German parents, and baptized on 25 January 1694. His father, Johan Leonard von Arensburg, was master of the Royal Mint, while his mother, Elisabet-Eleonora Formandt-Manderstrom, came from a family that had been ennobled in 1703. He served as an officer in the army of Charles XII of Sweden, and fought at the Battle of Poltava. King Charles XII presented him with an inscribed sword in thanks to his military service.

After the war, Karl moved to France from his home in Arensburg after it was invaded by Russia. He later took service with John Law's Mississippi Company, after being attracted by the prospect of fortune in the new world. While applying to the French for his colonial concession, he signed his name as the more French sounding 'Charles Frederick d’Arensbourg'. Sailing out from the Port of Lorient, Charles landed in Biloxi on 4 June 1721 aboard the Portefaix and accompanied by about thirty other Swedish officers and hundreds of German families.

German Coast Settlement 

By the time the German settlers had arrived in New France, many had died from disease. Originally assigned to lead the people to establish a settlement in what is now present day Arkansas, Charles abandoned this plan as the Mississippi Company had left them undersupplied and without food, shelter or transport. He instead lead the settlers to New Orleans where he befriended Governor Bienville. He had tried to secure passage back to France, but Bienville convinced Charles to instead settle in the fertile lands west of New Orleans.  The Germans were given government land grants along the Mississippi River, divide into four areas (Karlstein, Hoffen, Mariental, and Augsburg). D'Arensbourg grant, the largest, was named Karlstein in his honor.  With the help of a team of 80 lumberjacks, carpenters and other workers provided by The Mississippi Company, the German settlers built three European styled villages in the area.

He settled on a plantation within the concession and married a fellow German settler, Margaret Metzer. Despite setbacks, the German colony soon prospered and became key in supplying food to nearby New Orleans. Charles remained in Louisiana the rest of his life, leading the German settler community for more than fifty years, both as a civilian and military leader. He was made a Chevalier de St. Louis in 1765. Many of the German colonist were displeased with the new Spanish colonial governor Ulloa, and when the 1768 rebellion took place, d’Arensbourg organized a militia and marched them into New Orleans to assist the rebels. Ulloa soon abandoned the colony, but when Spanish forces returned, the rebellion leaders were arrested and executed. Despite being charged with treason by the Spanish, d’Arensbourg escaped being sentenced to death, due to his age. He died in 1777, at the age of 84, having been predeceased by his wife the year before.

References

Sources 

 
 
 

People of Louisiana (New France)
People from St. Charles Parish, Louisiana
People from Stockholm
Order of Saint Louis recipients
1693 births
1777 deaths